Baskin is a village in Franklin Parish, Louisiana, United States. The population was 254 at the 2010 census, up from 188 in 2000. Baskin is located north of the parish seat of Winnsboro.

History
Baskin was named in honor of Dr. Adolphus McDuffie Baskin, a pioneer settler.

Geography
Baskin is located in northwestern Franklin Parish at  (32.257544, -91.746378), along U.S. Route 425, which leads south  to Winnsboro and north  to Rayville.

Demographics

As of the census of 2000, there were 188 people, 77 households, and 47 families residing in the village. The racial makeup of the village was 94.68% White, 2.66% African American, 0.53% Native American, and 2.13% from two or more races. Hispanic or Latino of any race were 0.53% of the population.

There were 77 households, out of which 32.5% had children under the age of 18 living with them, 48.1% were married couples living together, 9.1% had a female householder with no husband present, and 37.7% were non-families. 33.8% of all households were made up of individuals, and 26.0% had someone living alone who was 65 years of age or older. The average household size was 2.36 and the average family size was 3.04.

In the village, the population was spread out, with 26.6% under the age of 18, 5.9% from 18 to 24, 25.0% from 25 to 44, 21.3% from 45 to 64, and 21.3% who were 65 years of age or older. The median age was 42 years. For every 100 females, there were 77.4 males. For every 100 females age 18 and over, there were 72.5 males.

The median income for a household in the village was $18,000, and the median income for a family was $31,875. Males had a median income of $26,250 versus $12,321 for females. The per capita income for the village was $16,034. About 22.0% of families and 24.3% of the population were below the poverty line, including 22.2% of those under the age of eighteen and 31.7% of those 65 or over.

Sports
The Baskin High School women's basketball team holds the record for longest winning streak in organized sports. The Lady Rams won 218 consecutive games from 1948 to 1953—a span of six years. Once the streak was broken, another 71 game streak continued. In the span of ten years, the Lady Rams led by Hall of Fame coach, Edna "Tiny" Tarbutton, would go 315–2 with nine state titles and an average winning margin of more than 30 points. In 1993, Tarbutton was inducted into the Louisiana Sports Hall of Fame located in Natchitoches.

Natives
Lainey Wilson, a country music singer, was born in Baskin.

References

External links

 Baskin Progress Community Progress Site for Baskin, LA

Villages in Franklin Parish, Louisiana
Villages in Louisiana